The following is the list of Lebanese Premier League top scorers by season from 1960–61. The latest top scorers are Fadel Antar and Mahmoud Siblini of Shabab Sahel and Nejmeh, respectively, who scored 10 goals each in 2021–22.

Fadi Alloush holds the record for most goals in a single season at 32, while Fouad Saad is the top scorer with the least seasonal goals at six. Seven players were top scorers more than once: Levon Altonian, Fadi Alloush, Mohammad Kassas, Mohammed Ghaddar, Lucas Galán, Elhadji Malick Tall, and Hassan Maatouk have all been top scorers twice. Mohammad Kassas became the first player to become the league top scorer twice in a row, in 2003–04 and 2004–05.

Winners

See also
 Al-Manar Football Festival

Notes

References

Top
Lebanon
Association football player non-biographical articles